Feng Jizhong may refer to:

 Feng Jizhong (architect), see Songjiang Square Pagoda and Mazu Cultural Palace
 Feng Jizhong, a character in The Deer and the Cauldron by Jin Yong